The Green Man is an ancient European symbol of nature.

Green Man or greenman phrase may also refer to:

Fiction
 Green Man (character), a DC Comics superhero
 Green Man (It's Always Sunny in Philadelphia), a persona assumed by Charlie Kelly in the sitcom It's Always Sunny In Philadelphia
 Ike! Greenman, a Japanese television series
 The Green Man (film), a 1956 film starring Alastair Sim as a jovial freelance assassin
 The Green Man, play by Doug Lucie
 The Green Man, a 1966 novel by Henry Treece adapted from the tale of Amleth
 The Green Man, a 1969 ghost-story novel by British author Kingsley Amis
 The Green Man (TV serial), 1990 BBC adaptation of the Kingsley Amis novel
 The Green Man, pastiche by Stephen Fry in the novel The Hippopotamus
 The Green Man, Harold Sherman novel
 The Green Man: Tales from the Mythic Forest, a 2002 anthology of short stories
 "The Green Man", an episode of Midsomer Murders
 "The Green Man", an episode of Worzel Gummidge (2019 TV series)
 The Green Man Press, comic-book illustrator Charles Vess' publishing company
 Someshta, the Green Man, a character in Robert Jordan's The Wheel of Time fantasy series
 Another name for Tammuz in the book series The Secrets of the Immortal Nicholas Flamel

Music
 Green Man (album), the 1996 debut album from British singer Mark Owen
 The Green Man (album), the 2000 release from British recording artist Roy Harper
 Green Man Festival, a major folk music festival held in the United Kingdom
 "Green Man", a song on the album October Rust by the band Type O Negative
 "Greenman", a song on the album Apple Venus Volume 1 by the new wave band XTC
 "Green Man", a song by the band Shut Up and Dance

People
 Greenman (surname)
 Albert DeSalvo, a 1960s serial rapist/killer – was arrested for the "Green Man" attacks, and then confessed to being the Boston Strangler
 Raymond Robinson (Green Man), a figure of Pennsylvania urban legend
 Little green men (Russo-Ukrainian War) is a news media term for men wearing balaclavas and military uniforms without insignia involved in the Russo-Ukrainian War in 2014.

Public houses 
 Green Man, Ashbourne
 Green Man, Blackheath
 The Green Man, Hatfield
 Green Man, Leytonstone
 The Green Man, Potters Bar
 Green Man, Putney
 Green Man, Soho
 Green Man, Trumpington
 Green Man, Whetstone
 Greene Man, formerly the Green Man, in Marylebone
 The Green Man and Still
 The Green Man at Inglewhite

Other uses
 Green Man (PGI), a figure associated with the Pyrotechnics Guild International, whose members may refer to each other as "green men"
 Green Man Brewery, a New Zealand brewery
 Al-Khidr, the Green Man, a Qur'anic figure prominent for his initiation of Moses
 Green Man, a communication device used at unstaffed police stations of the Garda Síochána in the Republic of Ireland
 Green man (symbol), an illuminated figure on traffic lights that indicates to pedestrians that they may cross the road

See also
 Green Knight, a figure in Arthurian legend
 Little Green Men (disambiguation), the stereotypical portrayal of extraterrestrials as small humanoid creatures with green skin
 The Green Men, supporters of the Vancouver Canucks